117 (one hundred [and] seventeen) is the natural number following 116 and preceding 118.

In mathematics
117 is the smallest possible length of the longest edge of an integer Heronian tetrahedron (a tetrahedron whose edge lengths, face areas and volume are all integers). Its other edge lengths are 51, 52, 53, 80 and 84.

117 is a pentagonal number.

In other fields
117 can be a substitute for the number 17, which is considered unlucky in Italy. When Renault exported the R17 to Italy, it was renamed R117.

Chinese dragons are usually depicted as having 117 scales, subdivided into 81 associated with yang and 36 associated with yin.

In the Danish language the number 117 is often used as a hyperbolic term to represent an arbitrary but large number.

See also
 117 (disambiguation)

References

Integers